Karahan Yasir Subaşı (born 1 January 1996) is a Turkish professional footballer who plays as a left back for Konyaspor.

Professional career
A youth product of Fenerbahçe, Subaşı spent his early professional career on loan before transferring to Kayserispor on 12 July 2019. Subaşı made his professional debut with Kayserispor in a 1-1 Süper Lig tie with MKE Ankaragücü on 24 August 2019.

On 12 June 2022, Subaşı signed a three-year contract with Konyaspor.

References

External links
 
 
 

1996 births
Sportspeople from Adapazarı
Living people
Turkish footballers
Turkey youth international footballers
Association football fullbacks
Fenerbahçe S.K. footballers
Anadolu Üsküdar 1908 footballers
Sakaryaspor footballers
Ümraniyespor footballers
Kayserispor footballers
Konyaspor footballers
Süper Lig players
TFF First League players
TFF Second League players